Elements of Destruction is a video game developed by Frozen Codebase and Black Lantern Studios for Windows, Nintendo DS and Xbox 360.

Gameplay
The game takes place in the town with an aerial view, and the objective for the player is to cause as much destruction as possible by causing and guiding tornadoes, lightning storms, earthquakes and other phenomena.

Reception

The DS and Xbox 360 versions received "mixed or average reviews" according to the review aggregation website Metacritic.

References

External links
 
 

2007 video games
Black Lantern Studios games
Frozen Codebase games
Multiplayer and single-player video games
Nintendo DS games
Strategy video games
THQ games
Video games developed in the United States
Video games scored by Jake Kaufman
Windows games
Xbox 360 Live Arcade games